Prosper André (17 January 1829, Fillières - 15 July 1883) was a French republican politician. He was a member of the National Assembly in 1871. He belonged to the Centre gauche parliamentary group.

References

1829 births
1883 deaths
People from Meurthe-et-Moselle
Politicians from Grand Est
French republicans
Members of the National Assembly (1871)